Siblings Day is a holiday recognized annually in some parts of the United States and Canada on April 10, and as Brothers and Sisters Day on May 31 in Europe. Unlike Mother's Day and Father's Day, it is not federally recognized in the United States, though the Siblings Day Foundation is working to change this. Since 1998, the governors of 49 states have officially issued proclamations to recognize Siblings Day in their state.

Siblings Days are celebrated also in India. The Hindu holiday of Raksha Bandhan, which is the oldest festival in this category, also celebrates the bond of brothers and sisters.

History

The US holiday was conceived by Claudia Evart to honor the memory of her brother and sister, who died at early ages. The Siblings Day Foundation was incorporated in 1997 and achieved non-profit status in 1999.

In Europe, the holiday was launched in 2014 by the European Large Families Confederation (ELFAC) to celebrate siblings bonds and relationships. The May 31 feast spread in different ways in the European countries where ELFAC is present. In Portugal, Dia dos Irmãos has become very popular and the President of Republic of Portugal has greeted it publicly, in 2016 and 2017.

ELFAC has associate members in several European countries: Austria, Cyprus, Croatia, Czech Republic, Estonia, France, Germany, Greece, Hungary, Italy, Latvia, Lithuania, Portugal, Romania, Serbia and Switzerland. But adherence to the date and spirit of May 31 is open to any other European or non-European country.

Celebration
In the United States, approximately 80% of people have siblings. The holiday is intended to be a celebration of the relationship of brothers and sisters.

Examples of commemoration during this observance include giving your sibling a gift (including a surprise gift), a giftcard, and taking one out for dinner. Nonmaterial examples of observances during this day includes giving hugs to your sibling(s), enjoying time with them, honoring their presence in your life, and greeting them on various social media platforms using childhood photos.

See also
 Children's Day
 Rakhri
 Raksha Bandhan: a popular, traditionally Hindu, annual Siblings Day

References

External links
 Siblings Day Foundation
 Fox News Video on Siblings Day
 Brothers and Sisters Day

April observances
Customs involving siblings
Family member holidays
May observances
Sibling